The South Henry School Corporation is a public school corporation located in southern Henry County, Indiana. The district was formed in 1963 through the consolidation of schools in Dudley, Franklin, and Spiceland townships. Tri Junior-Senior High School, dedicated in November 1970, absorbed former high schools in Lewisville, New Lisbon, Spiceland and Straughn.

Schools

Secondary
Tri Junior-Senior High School (7-12)

Elementary
Tri Elementary School (K-6)
Spiceland Elementary (K-4) (Closed)

References 

School districts in Indiana
Education in Henry County, Indiana
School districts established in 1963
1963 establishments in Indiana